Porto Calvo is a municipality in the state of Alagoas, Brazil. Its population was 27,249 in 2020 and its area is 260 km². It was founded in 1636.

References

Municipalities in Alagoas